The NCAA Bowling Championship is a sanctioned women's championship in college athletics. Unlike many NCAA sports, only one National Collegiate championship is held each season with teams from Division I, Division II, and Division III competing together. Sixteen teams, eight of them automatic qualifiers and the other eight being at-large selections, are chosen by the NCAA Bowling Committee to compete in the championship. The championship was first held in April 2004.

The most successful team is Nebraska with 6 titles. McKendree are the reigning champions, defeating Stephen F. Austin 4 games to 0 in the 2022 championship held at Wayne Webb's Columbus Bowl in Columbus, OH.

Nebraska is the only program to qualify for all 18 NCAA Bowling Championships since the NCAA started sponsoring bowling in the 2003-04 season.

Format
The collegiate bowling season runs from late October through the end of March, and the National Collegiate Women's Bowling Championship is held in April.

Through 2017
The format for the championships from 2004-2017 began with qualifying rounds in which each team bowled one five-person regular team game against each of the other seven teams participating in the championship.

Teams would then be seeded for bracket play based on their qualifying rounds win–loss record and then competed in best-of-seven-games Baker matches in a double elimination tournament.  In the Baker format, each of the five team members, in order, bowls one frame until a complete (10-frame) game is bowled.  A Baker match tied 3½ games to 3½ games after seven games is decided by a tiebreaker, using the Modified Baker format, which takes the scoring from only frames 6 thru 10.

2018 and 2019
In previous years, all eight participants received at-large bids. In 2018 the NCAA Women's Bowling Committee selected a field of ten participants. Six teams are automatic qualifiers from the conferences that have been granted an automatic bid, and the other four receive at-large bids. At that time, the six conferences that fulfilled the criteria to be granted an automatic qualifier were the Division I Mid-Eastern Athletic Conference, Northeast Conference, Southland Bowling League, and Southwestern Athletic Conference, plus the Division II Central Intercollegiate Athletic Association and East Coast Conference. The ten participants were ranked and seeded based on the criteria used by the selection committee. The top six seeds automatically entered the championship bracket. The four lowest-seeded teams played in on-campus opening round matches to determine the two participants advancing to the eight-team championship bracket. To minimize travel costs, the matchups were determined by geographical proximity rather than seedings.

In 2019, the championship field expanded from 10 to 12 teams, coinciding with two new conferences fulfilling the criteria for automatic qualification—the Division II Mid-America Intercollegiate Athletics Association (MIAA) and the Division III Allegheny Mountain Collegiate Conference. Accordingly, eight conference champions received automatic bids, and the NCAA Women's Bowling Committee selected four at-large teams to fill out the 12-team field. The top four teams were seeded into the Championship bracket, while the eight remaining teams competed in four play-in matches. The winners of these matches were seeded into the eight-team championship bracket.

Qualifying rounds were eliminated in favor of a seeded double-elimination bracket. Each match within the bracket consisted of best-of-three matches using specified formats (five-person regular team matches, Baker total pinfall, and Baker match play).

The championship finals were a best-of-seven match using Baker match play rules. The tiebreaker rule used through 2017 will still apply to Baker match play in the new format.

From 2020
The championship was scheduled to expand to 16 teams in 2020. The number of automatic bids was reduced by one after the MIAA bowling league disbanded at the end of the 2018–19 season. Although five schools that had participated in the final season of MIAA bowling became part of the new bowling league of the Great Lakes Valley Conference (GLVC), those schools were not in the same bowling league for a sufficient time to allow the GLVC to inherit the MIAA's automatic bid.

The 2020 tournament was intended to be the first to feature regional play. The field was to be split into four regions, each with four teams competing at predetermined sites; each of the top four seeds as chosen by the NCAA selection committee would be placed in a separate regional. Each regional was to be played as a double-elimination tournament, with the format identical to that introduced for the championship event in 2019. All regional matches, except for what the NCAA calls "if necessary regional finals", are best-of-three matches bowled in the following order: five-person team, Baker total pinfall, Baker best-of-seven match play. Any "if necessary regional final" will be Baker best-of-seven. Regional winners will advance to the championship event, which will also be double-elimination. All matches will be bowled under the standard format for regionals (best-of-three matches using specified formats in a specific order) except the championship final, which will be Baker best-of-seven.

On March 12, 2020, the NCAA announced that the 2020 tournament was canceled due to the COVID-19 pandemic.

The 2021 tournament featured six automatic berths (CIAA had its championship cancelled due to COVID-19) and ten at-large selections. This was the first tournament to feature regional play. Both regional and championship rounds were all played at one site. The 2022 tournament saw the number of automatic bids increase by two, to eight, with the GLVC champion receiving an automatic bid for its champion and the CIAA champion returning after a one-year absence. There were eight at-large selections. For the first time, regional competition took place at four predetermined regional sites - Erie, PA, Rochester, NY, Lansing, MI, and Arlington, TX, with the regional winners advancing to the championship round.

Champions

Team titles

Result by school and year

34 teams have appeared in the NCAA Tournament in at least one year starting with 2004. The results for all years are shown in this table below.

Conference affiliations in the table reflect those in place for the 2021–22 school year.

The code in each cell represents the furthest the team made it in the respective tournament:
  National Champion
  National Runner-up
  Semifinalists
 ,  (In 2004-06, there was one 8-team bracket, rather than two 4-team brackets, so there were distinct 3rd and 4th place teams.) (Beginning in 2021, there are four regionals, with the four regional winners advancing to the championship bracket, which is double-elimination, so there are distinct 3rd and 4th place teams.)
  Tied for 5th place
  Tied for 7th place
  Played in opening round games but did not make it to final 8-team bracket. (Two teams in 2018, four in 2019.) Beginning in 2021, played in regionals, but did not make it to final 4-team championship bracket (Twelve teams.)

NCAA Programs
A total of 93 teams competed in the 2021–22 season:
 35 from Division I
 35 from Division II
 23 from Division III

Conferences
 Allegheny Mountain Collegiate Conference (10 D-III schools)
 Central Atlantic Collegiate Conference (6 D-II schools)
 The CACC started sponsoring bowling in 2022–23.  It currently does not have enough bowling members to receive an automatic bid; even if it did, it would not be eligible until 2024–25.
 Central Intercollegiate Athletic Association (10 D-II schools)
 College Conference of Illinois and Wisconsin (9 D-III schools)
 The CCIW effectively absorbed the Central Intercollegiate Bowling Conference, a D-III league that had received official NCAA recognition in 2019–20. Four of the six CIBC members were already full CCIW members. Assuming that at least seven of the eight inaugural bowling members continue to compete in the CCIW, it will receive its first automatic bid to the Championship in 2022–23.
 Conference Carolinas and Great Midwest Athletic Conference (8 D-II schools)
 The two D-II leagues announced that they would conduct a joint bowling championship effective in 2021–22. Assuming that at least seven of the eight inaugural members continue to compete in the alliance, it will receive its first automatic bid to the Championship in 2023–24.
East Coast Conference (9 D-II and 1 D-I schools)
Great Lakes Valley Conference (7 D-II schools)
Mid-Eastern Athletic Conference (9 D-I schools)
Northeast Conference (7 D-I schools)
Southland Bowling League (6 D-I schools)
Southwestern Athletic Conference (9 D-I schools)

See also
NAIA Women's Bowling Championship
NAIA Men's Bowling Championship

Notes

References

External links
National Tenpin Coaches Association
NCAA bowling
NCAA Women's Bowling Championship Tournament Records
U.S. Bowling Congress intercollegiate champions